Hickinbotham Brothers Shipbuilders was a shipbuilding company in Stockton, California on the Stockton Channel. To support the World War II demand for ships Hickinbotham Brothers built: Type V ship Tugboats, Tank Landing Barge, balloon barges and Coastal Freighter (design 381, 381 tons). Hickinbotham Brothers also called Hickinbotham Brothers Construction Division  was opened in 1852 and is still a working shipyard. Hickinbotham Brothers started by building: horse carriages, horse wagons, threshers and Combine harvester. In 1942 Ronald Guntert and L. R. Zimmerman ran the company as a partnership on the Banner Island waterfront.  After World War II, Guntert and Zimmerman purchased Hickinbotham out and renamed the company Guntert & Zimmerman Construction. In 1984 the company moved to Ripon, California on the Stanislaus River, as the business continues. The Banner Island waterfront yard was on the deepwater port on the Stockton Ship Channel of the Pacific Ocean and an inland port located more than seventy nautical miles from the ocean, on the Stockton Channel and San Joaquin River-Stockton Deepwater Shipping Channel (before it joins the Sacramento River to empty into Suisun Bay. Notable ship: USNS Shearwater (T-AG-177).

Ships

See also
 California during World War II
Maritime history of California
Moore Equipment Company in Stockton
 Wooden boats of World War 2
Cryer & Sons

References

 Hickinbotham Brothers
American Theater of World War II
1940s in California
American boat builders